The men's freestyle 97 kg is a competition featured at the Golden Grand Prix Ivan Yarygin 2018, and was held in Krasnoyarsk, Russia on the 28th of January.

Medalists

Results
Legend
F — Won by fall

Final

Top half
qualification: Rasul Magomedov def. Magomed Magomedov of Dagestan (10–2)
qualification: Shamil  Musaev of Dagestan vs. Igor Ovsyannikov of Krasnoyarsk Krai def. (2–4)

Section 1

Repechage

References

Men's freestyle 97 kg